You Win Again may refer to:

 You Win Again (album), a 2000 album by Van Morrison and Linda Gail Lewis
 "You Win Again" (Bee Gees song), 1987
 "You Win Again" (Hank Williams song), 1952
 "You Win Again" (Mary Chapin Carpenter song)
 "You Win Again", a song by Jason Raize
 "So You Win Again", a 1977 song by Hot chocolate